The Ashdown mine is an American gold mine located in Humboldt County,  south of Denio, NV in the state of Nevada. The mine is owned by Win-Eldrich Mines, a Canadian mining company. An assay consisting of 194 holes estimates an open-pit mining of 78,000 to 117,000 ounces of gold which can be extracted using heap leaching methods.

Win-Eldrich has a permit for underground mining and for the operation of a flotation mill on-site.

See also 
 List of gold mines
 Gold mining in Nevada

References 

Gold mines in Nevada